The German submachine gun EMP (Erma Maschinenpistole) also known as MPE (Maschinenpistole Erma) was produced by the Erma factory, and was based on designs acquired from Heinrich Vollmer. The gun was produced from 1931 to 1938 in roughly 10,000 exemplars (in three main variants) and exported to Spain, Mexico, China and Yugoslavia, but also used domestically by the SS. It was produced under license in Spain by the arsenal of A Coruña under the designation M41/44.

History 
In the early 1920s, Vollmer started to develop his own sub-machineguns. His early models, named VPG, VPGa, VPF and VMP1925 were fairly similar to the MP18. The VMP1925 had a wooden handgrip and was fed by a 25-round drum magazine. The VMP1925 was secretly tested by the Reichswehr, along with competing designs from Schmeisser and Rheinmetall. (The Reichswehr was prohibited by the Versailles Treaty from having sub-machine guns in service, although the German police were allowed to carry a small number.) Secret funding was given to Vollmer to continue development, and this resulted in the VMP1926, which mostly differed from its predecessor by the removal of the cooling jacket. A subsequent development was the VMP1928, which introduced a 32-round box magazine sticking from the left side. The final development of this series was the VMP1930. (It can also be seen at the WTS.) This model introduced a substantive innovation—a telescoping main spring assembly, which made the gun more reliable and easier to assemble and disassemble in the field. Vollemer applied for a patent for his innovation in 1930 and it was granted in 1933 as DRP# 580620. His company, Vollmer Werke, produced however only about 400 of these, and most were sold to Bulgaria. In late 1930, the Reichswehr stopped supporting Vollmer financially; consequently he sold the rights to all his designs to the company known as Erma Werke (which is an abbreviation for Erfurter Maschinenfabrik, Berthold Geipel GmbH).

The submachine guns that Erma started to sell in 1932 under the names EMP (Erma Maschinenpistole) or MPE (Maschinenpistole Erma) was basically just the VMP1930 with the cooling jacket restored. Although there were several variants with varying barrel lengths and sights made to customers' specifications, roughly three main variants were produced: one with a 30 cm barrel, tangent rear sight and bayonet lug was apparently sold to Bulgaria or Yugoslavia. The second model, sometimes called the MP34, or the "standard model", had a 25 cm barrel and no provision for a bayonet; the rear sight on these varies—some had a tangent sight, others a simplified flip-up "L" sight. A third variant was basically similar in the metallic parts, but replaced the foregrip with an MP18-style stock with finger-grooves. Overall, at least 10,000 of these Vollmer-based designs were made by Erma. They were adopted by the SS and the German Police, but also sold to Mexico, Yugoslavia and Spain. During the Spanish Civil War, the EMP was used by both the Republicans and the Nationalists.

In the Spring of 1939, a large number of defeated Spanish Republicans fled to France, where they were disarmed. Some 3,250 EMPs formerly in the possession of these fighters ended up in a French warehouse at Clermont-Ferrand. The EMPs were usually referred to as the "Erma–Vollmer" in French documents. The French tested the weapons and decided to adopt them for their own service. A provisional manual was printed in French as Provisoire sur le pistolet-mitrailleur Erma – Vollmer de 9mm, issued on December 26, 1939 and updated on January 6, 1940. However, the French had obtained only some 1,540 suitable magazines for these guns, so only 700-800 EMPs were actually distributed to the French forces, mostly to the Mobile Gendarmerie. After the Germans conquered France, some EMPs armed the Legion of French Volunteers Against Bolshevism, which eventually became part of the SS Charlemagne division. This division was practically destroyed in February 1945 in Eastern Prussia, now part of Poland. Numerous EMPs have been found in the last-stand battlefields of the SS Charlemagne division; most of these guns lack any German military stamps or marks. The EMPs which arrived in German hands via the French route were given the (Fremdgerät) designation 740(f). The Yugoslav purchased EMPs were used by both the Partisans and the Chetniks.

In Francoist Spain, the EMP, chambered in the 9mm Largo cartridge, was locally produced until the mid-1950s. It was designated Model 1941/44 or "subfusil Coruña". It performed poorly during the Ifni War.

Design 
Its arming lever is on the right. The magazine housing, which is on the left, is slightly canted forwards to assist in feeding ammunition. The weapon could be fired either in semi-automatic or fully automatic modes.

Influence 
The final development at Erma is known as the EMP 36. This can be considered an intermediate model between the EMP and the MP38. Although many details of the mechanism were changed from the EMP, it retained Vollmer's telescoping main operating spring basically unchanged. On the exterior, the most obvious differences are that the magazine housing was now almost vertical, although still canted slightly to the left and forward. The solid wood stock was replaced with a wood frame and a folding metal butt. It is not entirely clear who designed the EMP 36, although Berthold Geipel himself is usually credited. Apparently, the features of the new design were the result of another secret contract with the German army. The EMP's telescopic cylinder return spring guide was retained for the Maschinenpistole 38.

Users 
 : used the VMP1930 during the Chaco War
 
 
Vichy France (small amount issued to Milice française)
 
 :Exported by Nationalist forces and used during the Second-Sino Japanese War
 
 : The Norwegian Police Service Assault Group (Statspolitiet) bought 8 VMP1930 submachine guns in 1932
 : A few were bought before the Chaco War, also fielded captured Bolivian guns
 
 : in 9×19mm Parabellum

See also
MP 40
PM wz. 39M
EMP 44
List of submachine guns
List of World War II firearms of Germany

References

Further reading
 K.R. Pawlas (1994) "Die Maschinenpistole Erma (MPE)", Waffen Revue Nr. 95, pp. 47–56
 L. Guillou (1994) "Le pistolet mitrailleur Erma-Vollmer de 1931 cal.9 mm Para." Gazette des armes numéro 254
 Les P.M. Allemands (1918-1945) - Gazette des armes hors-serie n° 19

External links
Springfield Armory Museum item# 1712
http://www.iwm.org.uk/collections/item/object/30029386
http://www.iwm.org.uk/collections/item/object/30029289
 http://www.armeetpassion.com/ermavollmer.html
 https://archive.today/20130811141900/http://www.coebaleares.com/index.php/es/armamentocoe/subfusil-mod-c
 More photos
Modern Firearms

World War II submachine guns
World War II infantry weapons of Germany
World War II infantry weapons of France
Submachine guns of Germany
Erma Werke firearms
9mm Parabellum submachine guns
Military equipment introduced in the 1930s